The Pennsylvania State Game Lands Number 203 are Pennsylvania State Game Lands located in Allegheny County, Pennsylvania in the United States.

Geography
The larger parcel is located in Franklin Park and Marshall Township. The smaller parcel is located in Springdale Township. The eastern parcel falls within the Yutes Run watershed and Pennsylvania Route 28 passes just to the south. Both watersheds are part of the Ohio River basin.

Statistics
It was entered into the Geographic Names Information System on 1 April 1990 as identification number 1208078.

Amenities
SGL 203 features a practice pistol range and separate rifle range with 25, 50, and 100 yard targets. Both ranges feature handicap accessible parking and shooting tables.

Biology
SGL 203 is 94% forested dominated by oak and Mesophytic and other eastern deciduous trees. Hunting includes White-tailed deer (Odocoileus virginianus), Common pheasant (Phasianus colchicus), Eastern cottontail rabbit (Sylvilagus floridanus), Eastern gray squirrel (Sciurus carolinensis). Fur game includes Coyote (Canis latrans), Gray fox (Urocyon cinereoargenteus), red fox (Vulpes Vulpes), American mink (Neovison vison), Muskrat (Ondatra zibethicus), and Raccoon (Procyon lotor).

See also
 Pennsylvania State Game Lands

References

Protected areas of Allegheny County, Pennsylvania
203